KSBW (channel 8) is a television station licensed to Salinas, California, United States, serving the Monterey Bay area as an affiliate of NBC and ABC. Owned by Hearst Television, the station has studios on John Street (Highway 68) in downtown Salinas, and its transmitter is located on Fremont Peak in the Gabilan Mountains. The call letters KSBW stand for "Salad Bowl of the World," which is the nickname of the city of Salinas.

History

Early years
KSBW began broadcasting on September 11, 1953. It shared the channel 8 frequency with KMBY-TV of Monterey until the two stations merged in 1955 under KSBW's license and call letters. Originally, it was affiliated with all four major networks—NBC, ABC, CBS and DuMont; the latter folded in 1955. ABC disappeared from KSBW's programming schedule when San Jose's then-independent KNTV decided to concentrate on the Monterey–Salinas market in 1960. For the next nine years, KSBW was forced to shoehorn NBC and CBS into its schedule. This was unusual for a two-station market (especially one of Monterey's size); in most such markets, ABC was relegated to secondary status on the CBS and NBC affiliates. When KMST-TV (now KION-TV) signed on as a full-time CBS affiliate in 1969, KSBW became an exclusive NBC affiliate.

Partnership with KSBY
In 1957, KSBW's original owners bought KVEC-TV in San Luis Obispo, California, and changed the calls to KSBY. For the next 22 years, KSBY simulcasted KSBW, except for producing its own local newscasts and covering CBS programming. In San Luis Obispo, KCOY-TV provided CBS programming from adjacent Santa Maria, requiring KSBY to drop the feed from Salinas when KSBW was carrying a CBS network program. The simulcasting ended when Blair Broadcasting bought the two stations in 1979 and KSBY became a free-standing station. On November 12, 1986, Blair Broadcasting sold most of its English-language stations to Gillett Communications (which would later acquire most of Storer Broadcasting's stations).

Ownership change
However, KSBW was not very successful in reaching this audience. San Jose viewers (and advertisers) gravitated to Bay Area stations broadcasting from San Francisco and Oakland, in addition to San Jose-based stations. In 2000, KSBW abandoned the tower in favor of their original broadcasting point at Fremont Peak. In any case, the following year, when San Jose's KNTV acquired the Bay Area NBC affiliation (and was purchased by NBC itself), NBC would likely have enforced market exclusivity with KNTV. KSBW currently broadcasts atop a  tower on Fremont Peak.

The tall Mount Madonna tower still stands today and is visible from many locations in the South Bay. This tower is currently leased to Etheric Networks by its current owner, the Mount Madonna Tower Association, and is used today mainly for long-range wireless Internet.

Gillett Holdings, a subsidiary of Vail Associates at that time, owned just the two stations, along with nearby station KSBY, two ski resorts, and a packing company. Gillett later filed for bankruptcy on August 17, 1992, after the ski area and its media company was due to emerge from bankruptcy. Gillett restructured into SCI TV and put KSBW and KSBY on the market. However, a buyer for both stations was not found until after SCI sold most of its stations to New World Communications in 1993. The following year, KSBW and KSBY were sold to EP Communications, a company co-owned by Elisabeth Murdoch, daughter of News Corporation chairman and CEO Rupert Murdoch.In 1995, Smith Broadcasting and SJL Communications teamed up to purchase the EP stations, with KSBW going to Smith Broadcasting and KSBY going to SJL because Smith Broadcasting already owned KEYT. At the time, the Federal Communications Commission (FCC) did not allow common ownership of two stations in the same market. What was then called Hearst-Argyle Television bought KSBW, along with WPTZ in Plattsburgh, New York, and its semi-satellite WNNE in White River Junction, Vermont, from Sunrise Television (at that time a subsidiary of Smith Broadcasting) in 1998, swapping WDTN in Dayton, Ohio, and the license for WNAC-TV in Providence, Rhode Island; both stations were required to be divested by Hearst due to since-repealed FCC restrictions on ownership of stations with overlapping city-grade signals.

KSBW-DT2
In early 2005, KSBW debuted its localized version of NBC Weather Plus, branded as KSBW Weather Plus on its second digital subchannel. NBC's national Weather Plus operations were shut down on December 1, 2008, after the network's parent company NBCUniversal purchased The Weather Channel. However, KSBW continued to use the L-bar graphics while changing the local forecast frequency to eight times per hour. KSBW's Prime Plus programming block debuted on August 2, 2010, although it is broadcast Monday through Friday nights during prime time. Prime+ consisted of repeat of the 6:00 p.m. newscast, Access Hollywood, Dr. Phil, Oprah and a 10:00 p.m. newscast. KSBW Weather Plus continued to air on the subchannel during the time that Prime Plus was not on the air.

KSBW-DT2 and its ABC affiliation launched on April 18, 2011, branded as "Central Coast ABC." This marks a return of the ABC affiliation to the immediate Monterey Bay market in 51 years after KSBW dropped the secondary affiliation. Before KSBW-DT2's launch, ABC formerly served the area by San Jose-based KNTV for four decades before it was replaced by a cable-only feed of San Francisco-based KGO-TV in 2000. Previously, both KNTV and KGO-TV (along with other stations from the San Francisco television market) were carried on Salinas–Monterey area cable systems for decades beforehand.

News operation

KSBW currently broadcasts more local news than any other station in the market, with 28½ hours total (4½ hours each weekday and three hours each on Saturdays and Sundays). On weekdays, a two-hour morning newscast is shown at 5:00 a.m., followed by half-hour news blocks at noon and 5:00 p.m., one hour at 6:00 p.m., and a 35-minute wrap-up at 11:00 p.m. On weekends, KSBW broadcasts the market's only two-hour, early-morning weekend newscast at 7:00 a.m., followed by half-hour blocks at 6:00 p.m. and 11:00 p.m. With the exception of its noon newscast on weekdays, KSBW-DT2 simulcasts all of its parent station's newscasts, subject to preemption on one channel due to NBC or ABC obligations. (It is noted that KSBW is currently one of three stations in the entire Central Coast to carry both a noon newscast on weekdays and a morning newscast on weekends, since as of June 2021, KEYT has launched a midday newscast at 11:00 a.m. weekdays, and fellow NBC affiliate KSBY also launched a new 11 a.m. midday newscast, while rivals KCBA, KION, KCOY and KKFX do not currently offer a noon or a weekend morning newscast.)

KSBW also operates a Santa Cruz newsroom to this day. It was destroyed during the 1989 Loma Prieta earthquake when one reporter was working there. The station started to broadcast live coverage of the earthquake from the time it struck until just after midnight, then from 10:00 a.m. to 8:00 p.m. the following day. In both cases, it included a live broadcast from Santa Cruz.

On August 2, 2010, KSBW began local newscasts on its Prime Plus programming block beginning with the debut of KSBW's 10:00 p.m. newscast on its second digital subchannel, as well as its 7:00 p.m. repeat of the 6:00 p.m. newscast. Sunday evening newscasts when NBC Sunday Night Football is carried on KSBW. However, those newscasts were broadcast with limited functionality. With a dual NBC/ABC affiliation, all newscasts, especially on weekends, are subject to delay or preemption under network obligations.

KSBW's notably stable weekday-evening anchor team are Dan Green and Erin Clark, who have worked together since 1998 and anchor the 6:00 p.m. and 11:00 p.m. newscasts. Jim Vanderzwaan, known more commonly as "Lead Forecaster" rather than being called "Chief Meteorologist", has been with the station since 1983. On February 1, 2015, Jim Vanderzwaan announced that he was retiring from KSBW after 32 years at the station and that current morning weather anchor Lee Solomon would take over as Chief Meteorologist beginning in June, 2015. The other anchor teams and reporting staff have less longevity, but field reporters Felix Cortez and Phil Gomez are station veterans, having been with the station since the late 1990s. The most recent addition to the weekday evening team is Dina Ruiz-Eastwood, who first came to KSBW in 1991. Eastwood, the wife of actor Clint Eastwood, retired in 1997, but returned to the station on February 8, 2011, and occasionally anchors the 5:00 p.m. newscasts.

In September 2020, Joseph W. Heston, who had served as KSBW's president and general manager, announced his retirement. Heston created many charitable programs, including the Golden Whistle Award, the Crystal Apple Award, and so much more, raising hundreds of thousands of dollars for charity. He also hosted daily news editorials with a neutral perspective. The successor of Heston has not been named as of September 11, 2020.

Notable former on-air staff
 Del Rodgers – sports anchor, now sports director at KCRA-TV
 Ted Rowlands – reporter, now at CNN

Technical information

Subchannels 
The station's digital signal is multiplexed:

On April 25, 2016, the station's third subchannel launched, carrying the Spanish-language network Estrella TV.

Analog-to-digital conversion 
KSBW shut down its analog signal, over VHF channel 8, on June 12, 2009, the official date on which full-power television stations in the United States transitioned from analog to digital broadcasts under federal mandate. The station's digital signal relocated from its pre-transition VHF channel 10 to channel 8.

References

External links
 

1953 establishments in California
Hearst Television
NBC network affiliates
Estrella TV affiliates
Story Television affiliates
Television channels and stations established in 1953
SBW